Caelostomus ebeninus is a species of ground beetle in the subfamily Pterostichinae. It was described by Johann Christoph Friedrich Klug in 1832.

References

Caelostomus
Beetles described in 1832